Steve Voce (born 23 December 1933) is a British journalist and music critic.

As well as writing obituaries for The Independent, Voce has been a columnist for Jazz Journal for about 60 years, and presented the Jazz Panorama radio programme on BBC Radio Merseyside for 35 years.

References

1933 births
Living people
British music critics
Jazz writers